Ryan Scott Auger (born 9 May 1994) is an English footballer.

Career
Auger is the first £1 man  Auger began his career with Southend United youth academy, signing a professional contract in June 2013. He made his Football League debut on 26 October 2013 in a 3–1 defeat away at Newport County.

References

External links

1994 births
Living people
English footballers
Association football forwards
Southend United F.C. players
Soham Town Rangers F.C. players
St Neots Town F.C. players
Bishop's Stortford F.C. players
Histon F.C. players
Cambridge City F.C. players
A.F.C. Sudbury players
English Football League players